Clifford Hayes (born 13 August 1951) is a former Australian politician. He was a Sustainable Australia member of the Victorian Legislative Council between 2018 and 2022, representing Southern Metropolitan Region. He was not re-elected at the 2022 state election.

Film career
Before entering politics, Hayes worked as a television and film editor. In 1979, he and Tony Paterson jointly won the AFI Award for Best Editing for their work on the film Mad Max.

Political career

Local government (2005–2012)
In 2005, Hayes was elected as a councillor for the City of Bayside council representing the single-councillor ward of Were, winning 37.91% of the first preference vote. In 2008, following electoral boundary changes, he was re-elected to the new Northern ward with a quota that included a first preference vote of 20.69%. He was the Mayor of Bayside from 2009 to 2010. In 2012, he failed to be re-elected after his first preference vote percentage almost halved to 11.26%.

State parliament (2018–2022)

In 2018, Hayes stood as the leading candidate for Sustainable Australia for the Southern Metropolitan Region in the Parliament of Victoria. Hayes was elected to the final vacancy in the Southern Metropolitan Region with 1.32% of the vote.

In 2019, Hayes drafted a Motion in the Victorian Parliament to restore local democracy in planning issues and curb the power of the Victorian Civil Administrative Tribunal. In doing so, Hayes said that many residents had lost their right to a say in the character of their street, their neighbourhood and their community and called for "real say back in the hands of residents".

The Motion passed in the Legislative Council with the support of Members of the Liberal Party and the majority of the crossbench.

Later that year, Hayes proposed a Bill to legislate the changes outlined in the previous Motion. The Bill was defeated in the Legislative Council, 22-18. The Labor Government, Fiona Patten, Stuart Grimley, Tania Maxwell and Jeff Bourman voted against the legislation.

Hayes was elected as Deputy Chair of the Legislative Council’s Planning and Environment Committee, a standing committee appointed to find solutions and improvements to planning and environmental regulations in the state of Victoria.

In 2019, Hayes also moved a Motion in Parliament to ban property developer donations to political parties. His Motion was defeated by Labor Government and Liberal Party Members. Later that year, Hayes voted in favour of allowing transgender people to self ID their gender on documents without having to have surgery.

In 2020, Hayes secured an Inquiry into Planning and Heritage in Victoria. Hayes said the Inquiry was needed to protect Victoria’s "dwindling" heritage and to make improvements to a "broken" planning system. The Motion was supported by the Labor Government and the Liberal Party. It is expected to take place in 2021.

In 2021 Hayes voted against Change or Suppression (Conversion) Practices Prohibition Bill 2020, claiming it to be 'a trojan horse for overreach'.

According to The Age, between November 2018 and November 2021, Hayes voted with the Andrews Government's position 40.3% of the time, one of the lowest figures of any Legislative Council crossbencher.

References

External links

1951 births
Living people
Sustainable Australia members of the Parliament of Victoria
Members of the Victorian Legislative Council
Australian film editors
University of Melbourne alumni
People educated at Brighton Grammar School
21st-century Australian politicians
Victoria (Australia) local councillors
Mayors of places in Victoria (Australia)